Botanical gardens in Jamaica have collections consisting entirely of Jamaica native and endemic species; most have a collection that include plants from around the world. There are botanical gardens and arboreta in all states and territories of Jamaica, most are administered by local governments, some are privately owned.
 Bath Botanical Garden
 Castleton Botanical Garden
 Cinchona Botanical Garden
 Hope Botanical Garden
 National Heroes Park

References 

Jamaica
Botanical gardens